Agustín Valido (January 31, 1914 – February 23, 1998) was an Argentine football forward, who played in several Argentine and Brazilian top-level clubs.

Career
Born in Buenos Aires, Agustín Valido was part of the squad that won Primera División Argentina in 1934 while playing for Boca Juniors. He moved to Lanús in 1935, leaving the club in 1937. He traveled to Brazil in 1937, playing for a combined team named Becar Varella and attracting the attention of Flamengo's board of directors, who signed him. He played 138 games for the Rio de Janeiro club, scoring 44 goals, including one against Vasco in 1944, giving Flamengo their third consecutive state championship.

Honors

Club
Boca Juniors
Primera División Argentina: 1934

Flamengo
Campeonato Carioca: 1942, 1943, 1944

References

1914 births
1998 deaths
Argentine footballers
Club Atlético Lanús footballers
Boca Juniors footballers
CR Flamengo footballers
Argentine Primera División players
Argentine expatriate footballers
Expatriate footballers in Brazil
Argentine expatriate sportspeople in Brazil
Footballers from Buenos Aires
Association football forwards